Artemidiconus selenae is a species of sea snail, a marine gastropod mollusk in the family Conorbidae.

These snails are predatory and venomous. They are capable of "stinging" humans, therefore live ones should be handled carefully or not at all.

Description
The size of an adult shell varies between 7 mm and 19 mm.

Distribution
This species occurs in the Atlantic Ocean off Northern Brazil.

Description 
The maximum recorded shell length is 19 mm.

Habitat 
Minimum recorded depth is 18 m. Maximum recorded depth is 135 m.

References

 Filmer R.M. (2001). A Catalogue of Nomenclature and Taxonomy in the Living Conidae 1758–1998. Backhuys Publishers, Leiden. 388pp
 Tucker J.K. (2009). Recent cone species database. 4 September 2009 Edition
  Bouchet P., Kantor Yu.I., Sysoev A. & Puillandre N. (2011) A new operational classification of the Conoidea. Journal of Molluscan Studies 77: 273–308.

External links
 The Conus Biodiversity website